Nickel Ashmeade (born 7 April 1990) is a Jamaican sprinter who specialises in the 100 and 200 meters.

Nickel Ashmeade ran the third leg for Jamaica's 4 × 100 m team at the 2013 World Championships in Moscow which won the gold medal. Nickel Ashmeade finished 5th at the 2013 World Championships in Athletics in the 100 m in Moscow and 4th in the 200 m.

Career
A St. Jago High School teammate of Yohan Blake, Ashmeade first enjoyed success in the sprints as a junior athlete: at the 2006 Central American and Caribbean Junior Championships he beat compatriot Dexter Lee to the 100 m title, was runner-up to Ramone McKenzie over 200 m, and teamed up with the pair to bring Jamaica the 4×100 meter relay title. Another medal haul came for the young Jamaican at the 2007 World Youth Championships in Athletics, where he was second to Lee in the 100 m, ran a 200 m best of 20.76 seconds for the bronze medal, and helped the national team to another bronze in the sprint medley relay. He competed at the Penn Relays in 2008 and represented his school, St. Jago High School – an institution renowned for producing track and field athletes.

Ashmeade focused on the 200 m at the 2008 World Junior Championships in Athletics and he took the silver medal in the event, narrowly finishing behind France's Christophe Lemaitre. A second silver came in the 4×100 m relay and he departed from his usual oeuvre to help Jamaica to fourth place in the 4 × 400 m relay. The regional CARIFTA Games provided him the opportunity for further junior medals: he won the 200 m title and two relay gold medals at the 2008 edition and almost repeated the feat in 2009, with the sole difference being a 4×400 m relay silver. His final international outing as a junior athlete came at the 2009 Pan American Junior Athletics Championships in Port of Spain and he won the 200 m gold in a personal best of 20.40 seconds before going on to take a relay bronze medal.

He made the transition to the senior ranks at the 2009 Central American and Caribbean Championships in Athletics, where he won the 200 m race ahead of Rondel Sorrillo. After a quiet 2010, he made significant improvements at the start of the 2011 outdoor season. In May 2011, he completed his first 200 m in under 20 seconds in Kingston, running 19.96 seconds to surprise the more established Wallace Spearmon and improve upon his previous best by almost half a second. Ashmeade made similar progress in the 100 m at the Ponce Grand Prix later that month, setting a meet record to beat Justin Gatlin, 2004 Olympic and 2005 World champion, with a time of 10.05 seconds (an improvement of 0.24 seconds).
Ashmeade competed in the 100 m, 200 m, and 4 × 100 m relay at the 2013 World Championships. After finishing 5th in the 100 m and narrowly coming 4th in the 200 m, Ashmeade was part of the Jamaican 4 × 100 m relay team which won gold.

Ashmeade represented Jamaica in the 2016 Summer Olympics in Rio de Janeiro, Brazil. During his first Olympic Games, he finished fifth place in the semifinal rounds of the men's 100 m with a time of 10.05s and fourth in the 200 m semifinals with 20.31s. He earned his first Olympic medal as the third leg of the 4 × 100 m relay team, anchored by Usain Bolt, with a time of 37.27s.

Ashmeade has won a total of five medals representing Jamaica at the IAAF World Relays. The most recent being at the 2017 edition of the event in which he won a bronze medal in the 4 × 200 m relay. At the 2014 edition, Ashmeade won two gold medals in the 4 × 100 m relay and the 4 × 200 m relay running the first and second leg respectively. At the 2015 edition Ashmeade won a gold and silver. The gold was won in the 4 × 200 m relay whilst running the first leg and the silver was won in the 4 × 100 m relay running the third leg.

Personal bests

Achievements

References

External links

A Focused Nikel Ashmeade Runs Into The Spotlight

1990 births
Living people
Jamaican male sprinters
People from Saint Ann Parish
Commonwealth Games gold medallists for Jamaica
Commonwealth Games bronze medallists for Jamaica
Athletes (track and field) at the 2014 Commonwealth Games
World Athletics Championships athletes for Jamaica
World Athletics Championships medalists
Athletes (track and field) at the 2016 Summer Olympics
Olympic athletes of Jamaica
Olympic gold medalists for Jamaica
Olympic gold medalists in athletics (track and field)
Medalists at the 2016 Summer Olympics
Commonwealth Games medallists in athletics
World Athletics record holders (relay)
Diamond League winners
World Athletics Championships winners
20th-century Jamaican people
21st-century Jamaican people
Medallists at the 2014 Commonwealth Games